The eighteenth season of The Bachelorette premiered on October 19, 2021. This season features 28-year-old Michelle Young, an elementary school teacher from Woodbury, Minnesota. 

Young was the runner-up on the 25th season of The Bachelor featuring Matt James.

The season concluded on December 21, 2021, with Young accepting a proposal from 27-year-old sales executive Nayte Olukoya. They announced their breakup on June 17, 2022.

Production

Casting and contestants
Young was announced as the Bachelorette by Emmanuel Acho during the After the Final Rose special of the 25th season of The Bachelor on March 15, 2021.

The cast includes offensive guard Bryan Witzmann; undrafted tight end Clayton Echard; 2011 Minnesota Mr. Basketball award winner Joe Coleman; and LT Murray IV, grandson of actor Clint Eastwood.

Filming and development
On August 2, 2021, it was reported that former Bachelorettes Tayshia Adams and Kaitlyn Bristowe were set to return as co-hosts for the eighteenth season.

As with the last three American Bachelor Nation editions, which were filmed in a bio-secure bubble due to the COVID-19 pandemic, this season started production on July 30, 2021 at the Renaissance Esmeralda Resort & Spa at the Coachella Valley in Indian Wells, California. Some quarantine restrictions were lifted halfway through the season, the cast and crew were allowed to leave the bubble with limited amount of travel from one location to another including Young's home state of Minnesota. The cast and crew were valid proof of requirement of vaccination status. For the first time since the fifteenth season, the season was able to leave the United States, as both overnight dates and last chance dates returned to its standard format and took place in Mexico with COVID safety precautions in place.

On December 21, 2021, the day of the season finale, Adams revealed she had been exposed to COVID-19 and was not able to host the live finale and After the Final Rose special. This left Bristowe to be the sole host. Due to the potential COVID-19 resurgence, audiences must present a negative PCR test and wear masks for the duration of the show.

Contestants
35 potential contestants were revealed on July 26, 2021.

The final cast of 30 men was announced on September 27, 2021.

Future appearances

The Bachelor
Clayton Echard was chosen as the lead on the 26th season of The Bachelor shortly after the completion of filming of this season of The Bachelorette.

Bachelor in Paradise 
Brandon Jones, Casey Woods, Olu Onajide, Peter Izzo, Rick Leach, Rodney Mathews, and Romeo Alexander returned for season 8 of Bachelor in Paradise. Alexander left in a relationship with Kira Mengistu in week 2. Woods and Izzo quit in week 2. Leach and Onajide were eliminated in week 3. Mathews split from Eliza Isichei in week 5. Jones got engaged to Serene Russell in week 6.

Call-out order

 The contestant received the first impression rose
 The contestant received a rose during a date

 The contestant was eliminated
 The contestant was eliminated during a date
 The contestant was eliminated outside the rose ceremony
 The contestant won the competition

Episodes

Notes

References

External links

2021 American television seasons
The Bachelorette (American TV series) seasons
Television shows filmed in California
Television shows filmed in Minnesota
Television shows filmed in Mexico
Television series impacted by the COVID-19 pandemic